RNF Racing is a Malaysian independent Grand Prix motorcycle racing team that began competing in the 2022 season. The team competes with Aprilia motorcycles in the MotoGP class as a satellite team under the name CryptoDATA Aprilia RNF MotoGP Team, and in MotoE under the name RNF MotoE Team.

History
The team's origins began with the Sepang Racing Team (SRT) under ownership by the Sepang International Circuit and managed by circuit CEO Razlan Razali and former racers Johan Stigefelt and Wilco Zeelenberg. During the 2021 season, the principal sponsor Petronas announced they would be removing their support for the team at the end of the season, and shortly thereafter SRT announced they would cease all racing activities at the end of the season. Control of the team and its assets were taken over by Razali and Stigefelt to create the rebranded RNF Racing team, with an agreement from Dorna Sports for a grid slot at least until the end of 2026. Razali confirmed the significance of the team name as coming from the initials of his family name as well as the names of his children (Razali, Nadia and Farouk). On 30 October, RNF announced that Stigefelt would split from the team under "mutual agreement".

The team continued in 2022 under a number of SRT's previous agreements, with Italian rider Andrea Dovizioso on a factory-specification Yamaha YZR-M1. Darryn Binder was promoted from the Moto3 Petronas Sprinta Racing team as the team's second rider, aboard a 2021-specification Yamaha machine.

On 27 May 2022, it was announced that the team would use Aprilia bikes starting with the  season. In November 2022, it was announced that Romanian blockchain company CryptoDATA Tech had purchased a majority stake in the team which would be named CryptoDATA Aprilia RNF MotoGP Team for 2023. Riders Miguel Oliveira and Raúl Fernández joined from the KTM stable.

Results

By season

MotoGP results
(key) (Races in bold indicate pole position; races in italics indicate fastest lap)

References

External links
 

Motorcycle racing teams
Sports teams in Malaysia
Motorcycle racing teams established in 2021
2021 establishments in Malaysia